Several ships of the French Navy have borne the name Pomone, after the Roman goddess Pomona:

 , a 30-gun frigate, burnt to avoid capture in 1760.
  (1770), a requisitioned transport ship, sold in 1771.
She was sold in 1802 and broken up in 1803.
She was broken up in 1812. 
  (1821), a 28-gun corvette
 , a steam frigate

See also 
 

French Navy ship names